Sadleriana is a genus of small freshwater snails, aquatic gastropod mollusks in the family Hydrobiidae.

Species 
Species within the genus Sadleriana include:
 Sadleriana bavarica Boeters, 1989
 Sadleriana bulgarica (A. J. Wagner, 1928)
 Sadleriana byzanthina (Küster, 1852)
 Sadleriana cavernosa Radoman, 1978
 Sadleriana fluminensis (Kuster, 1853)
 Sadleriana sadleriana (Frauenfeld, 1863)
 Sadleriana sadleriana sadleriana (Frauenfeld, 1863)
 Sadleriana sadleriana robici (Clessin, 1890)
 Sadleriana schmidtii (Menke, 1849)
 Sadleriana supercarinata (Schutt, 1969)

Species brought into synonymy:
 Sadleriana pannonica (Frauenfeld, 1865) is a synonym of Bythinella pannonica (Frauenfeld, 1865).

References

External links
 

Hydrobiidae
Taxonomy articles created by Polbot